FC Nyva Vinnytsia is a professional Ukrainian football club based in the city of Vinnytsia. The name "Nyva" translates to "grain field". The club was originally created in 1958 in the Soviet Union and folded in 2005 and 2012, but was reformed again in 2015 as Nyva-V and renamed back to Nyva in 2018.

History

Previous clubs
A football team in Vinnytsia existed before the World War II as a local team of Vinnytsia city, which participated in championships among other cities. After the 1936 reorganization of football competition, the team then continued to play in lower tiers.

Following World War II, in 1946 football in Vinnytsia was represented by the Spartak society. In 1947 the team played under Dynamo's colors which for the next several years was regularly winning regional competitions and making finals appearances.

The teams names including "Trud", "Burevisnyk", and City Team.

Lokomotyv → Nyva
In 1958 then current club was established as a Soviet team of the local locomotive factory as Lokomotyv Vinnytsia, which was established on the initiative of the director of Southwestern Railway Petro Kryvonos.

After Ukraine gained independence from the Soviet Union in 1991, Nyva was selected to play in the inaugural Ukrainian Premier League in 1992, due to being one of the top 9 (of 11) Ukrainian teams from the West Division of the Soviet Second League in 1991.

After being relegated in 1992, Nyva spent the 1993 season in the Ukrainian second division in the First League. Nyva was quickly promoted back to the top level next season after winning the competition.

Nyva Vinnytsia's best achievement in the Ukrainian Premier League was 10th place finish in the 1993–94 season. The club also surprisingly made the 1995–96 Ukrainian Cup finals, only to lose to Dynamo Kyiv. As a result, Nyva took part in the 1996–97 UEFA Cup Winners' Cup, even progressing to the First round after beating JK Tallinna Sadam on away goals (1:2 loss in Tallinn and 1:0 win in Vinnytsia). However, Swiss side FC Sion beat the Ukrainian side with a 6:0 score on aggregate (2:0 in Sion and 4:0 in Vinnytsia) ending the dream run in Europe.

The club ceased to exist after it was relegated from the First League in 2006 because of financial difficulties. In 2006 it was replaced with FC Bershad from Bershad, Vinnytsia oblast (see FC Nyva Bershad).

Reformation 2007

In the 2007–08 season the club reentered professional league competition into the Second League as FC Nyva-Svitanok, the new part of its name meaning dawn, or new beginning. Also Svitanok is a name of a city's flower market.

On 8 July 2008, the club changed their name from "FC Nyva-Svitanok Vinnytsia" to "PFC Nyva Vinnytsia".

Reformation 2015

The club was again reformed and entered the Vinnytsia Oblast competition for the 2015–16 finishing in fifth place. The club competed in 2016 in the 2016 Ukrainian Football Amateur League finishing second in their group. 

The club successfully passed attestation and competed in the 2016–17 Ukrainian Second League season finishing 7th place.

At the end of 2020, the club announced about financial hardship, and acting president of the club Vadym Kudiarov complained about lack of interest from local government and public.

Stadiums
The club plays in one of two stadiums in Vinnytsia, Sports Complex Nyva which has a capacity of 5,000 spectators with the club's training facilities located there, and the Municipal Central Stadium (previously Lokomotyv) which was expanded prior to 1980's Olympics which now has a capacity of 24,000 spectators. The Central Stadium is usually used in "big" matches against famous opponents with all the other matches were played at SC Nyva.

Honors

Ukrainian Cup
 Runners-up (1): 1995–96
Ukrainian First League
 Winners (1): 1992–93
Championship of the Ukrainian SSR
 Winners (2): 1964, 1984
 Runners-up (3): 1963, 1981, 1985
Ukrainian Second League
 Runners-up (1): 2009–10 (Group A)
Ukrainian League Cup (among amateurs and lower leagues' clubs)
 Winners (1): 2009–10

Current squad
As of 16 July 2022

European record

Its first and the only European competition participation occurred in 1996–97 season in UEFA Cup Winners' Cup.

Notes
 1R: First round
 Q: Qualifying round

League and Cup history

{|class="wikitable"
|-bgcolor="#efefef"
! Season
! Div.
! Pos.
! Pl.
! W
! D
! L
! GS
! GA
! P
!Domestic Cup
!colspan=2|Europe
!Notes
|-
|align=center|1992
|align=center|1st "A"
|align=center|8
|align=center|18
|align=center|5
|align=center|4
|align=center|9
|align=center|18
|align=center|33
|align=center|14
|align=center| finals
|align=center|
|align=center|
|align=center bgcolor=red|Relegated
|-bgcolor=LightCyan
|align=center|1992–93
|align=center|2nd
|align=center bgcolor=gold|1
|align=center|42
|align=center|24
|align=center|14
|align=center|4
|align=center|73
|align=center|26
|align=center|62
|align=center| finals
|align=center|
|align=center|
|align=center bgcolor=green|Promoted
|-
|align=center|1993–94
|align=center|1st
|align=center|10
|align=center|34
|align=center|7
|align=center|6
|align=center|21
|align=center|25
|align=center|51
|align=center|20
|align=center| finals
|align=center|
|align=center|
|align=center|
|-
|align=center|1994–95
|align=center|1st
|align=center|14
|align=center|34
|align=center|10
|align=center|7
|align=center|17
|align=center|38
|align=center|51
|align=center|37
|align=center| finals
|align=center|
|align=center|
|align=center|
|-
|align=center|1995–96
|align=center|1st
|align=center|15
|align=center|34
|align=center|11
|align=center|7
|align=center|16
|align=center|28
|align=center|36
|align=center|40
|align=center bgcolor=silver|Runners-up
|align=center|
|align=center|
|align=center|
|-
|align=center|1996–97
|align=center|1st
|align=center|16
|align=center|30
|align=center|4
|align=center|6
|align=center|20
|align=center|19
|align=center|48
|align=center|18
|align=center| finals
|align=center|CWC
|align=center|1st round
|align=center bgcolor=red|Relegated
|-bgcolor=LightCyan
|align=center|1997–98
|align=center|2nd
|align=center|5
|align=center|42
|align=center|22
|align=center|7
|align=center|13
|align=center|58
|align=center|34
|align=center|73
|align=center| finals
|align=center|
|align=center|
|align=center|
|-bgcolor=LightCyan
|align=center|1998–99
|align=center|2nd
|align=center|6
|align=center|38
|align=center|16
|align=center|9
|align=center|13
|align=center|45
|align=center|39
|align=center|57
|align=center| finals
|align=center|
|align=center|
|align=center|
|-bgcolor=LightCyan
|align=center|1999–00
|align=center|2nd
|align=center|11
|align=center|34
|align=center|14
|align=center|6
|align=center|14
|align=center|29
|align=center|39
|align=center|48
|align=center| finals
|align=center|
|align=center|
|align=center|as FC Vinnytsia
|-bgcolor=LightCyan
|align=center|2000–01
|align=center|2nd
|align=center|10
|align=center|34
|align=center|12
|align=center|8
|align=center|14
|align=center|35
|align=center|41
|align=center|44
|align=center| finals
|align=center|
|align=center|
|align=center|as FC Vinnytsia
|-bgcolor=LightCyan
|align=center|2001–02
|align=center|2nd
|align=center|15
|align=center|34
|align=center|10
|align=center|8
|align=center|16
|align=center|35
|align=center|52
|align=center|38
|align=center| finals
|align=center|
|align=center|
|align=center|as FC Vinnytsia
|-bgcolor=LightCyan
|align=center|2002–03
|align=center|2nd
|align=center|16
|align=center|34
|align=center|9
|align=center|9
|align=center|16
|align=center|18
|align=center|31
|align=center|36
|align=center| finals
|align=center|
|align=center|
|align=center|as FC Vinnytsia
|-bgcolor=LightCyan
|align=center|2003–04
|align=center|2nd
|align=center|8
|align=center|34
|align=center|14
|align=center|10
|align=center|10
|align=center|34
|align=center|24
|align=center|52
|align=center| finals
|align=center|
|align=center|
|align=center|
|-bgcolor=LightCyan
|align=center|2004–05
|align=center|2nd
|align=center|5
|align=center|34
|align=center|15
|align=center|8
|align=center|11
|align=center|49
|align=center|38
|align=center|53
|align=center| finals
|align=center|
|align=center|
|align=center bgcolor=pink|Bankrupt
|-
|align=center|2005–06
|align=center colspan=13|Club Idle
|-bgcolor=SteelBlue
|align=center rowspan=3|2006
|align=center rowspan=3|4th
|align=center|2
|align=center|6
|align=center|2
|align=center|3
|align=center|1
|align=center|7
|align=center|3
|align=center|9
|align=center rowspan=3|
|align=center rowspan=3|
|align=center rowspan=3|
|align=center|Stage 1, as FC Nyva-Svitanok
|-bgcolor=SteelBlue
|align=center|2
|align=center|6
|align=center|3
|align=center|2
|align=center|1
|align=center|14
|align=center|5
|align=center|11
|align=center|Stage 2, as FC Nyva-Svitanok
|-bgcolor=SteelBlue
|align=center|4
|align=center|3
|align=center|0
|align=center|0
|align=center|3
|align=center|0
|align=center|2
|align=center|0
|align=center|Stage 3, as FC Nyva-Svitanok
|-bgcolor=PowderBlue
|align=center|2007–08
|align=center|3rd "A"
|align=center|9
|align=center|30
|align=center|10
|align=center|5
|align=center|15
|align=center|23
|align=center|40
|align=center|35
|align=center|Did not enter
|align=center|
|align=center|
|align=center|as FC Nyva-Svitanok
|-bgcolor=PowderBlue
|align=center|2008–09
|align=center|3rd "A"
|align=center bgcolor=tan|3
|align=center|32
|align=center|18
|align=center|7
|align=center|7
|align=center|40
|align=center|29
|align=center|61
|align=center| finals
|align=center|
|align=center|
|align=center|as PFC Nyva
|-bgcolor=PowderBlue
|align=center|2009–10
|align=center|3rd "A"
|align=center bgcolor=silver|2
|align=center|20
|align=center|12
|align=center|4
|align=center|4
|align=center|43
|align=center|16
|align=center|40
|align=center| finals
|align=center|
|align=center|
|align=center bgcolor=green|Promoted
|-bgcolor=LightCyan
|align=center|2010–11
|align=center|2nd
|align=center|10
|align=center|34
|align=center|14
|align=center|8
|align=center|12
|align=center|44
|align=center|42
|align=center|50
|align=center| finals
|align=center|
|align=center|
|align=center|
|-bgcolor=LightCyan
|align=center|2011–12
|align=center|2nd
|align=center|13
|align=center|34
|align=center|7
|align=center|11
|align=center|16
|align=center|21
|align=center|39
|align=center|32
|align=center| finals
|align=center|
|align=center|
|align=center bgcolor=red|Relegated
|-
|align=center|2012–15
|align=center colspan=13|Club Idle
|-
|align=center|2015–16
|align=center colspan=13|Club reforms and participates in oblast competition
|-bgcolor=SteelBlue
|align=center|2016
|align=center|4th
|align=center|2
|align=center|6 	
|align=center|2 	
|align=center|2 	
|align=center|2 	
|align=center|5 	
|align=center|5 	
|align=center|8
|align=center|
|align=center|
|align=center|
|align=center|
|-bgcolor=PowderBlue
|align=center|2016–17
|align=center|3rd
|align=center|7
|align=center|32 	 	
|align=center|14 	 	
|align=center|	8 		
|align=center|10 	 	
|align=center|42 	
|align=center|	33 	
|align=center|50
|align=center| finals
|align=center|
|align=center|
|align=center| 
|-bgcolor=PowderBlue
|align=center|2017–18
|align=center|3rd A
|align=center bgcolor=tan|3
|align=center|27 	
|align=center|	13 	
|align=center|6 		
|align=center|8 		
|align=center|	34 	 	
|align=center|	21 	
|align=center|45  	 	
|align=center| finals 
|align=center|
|align=center|
|align=center|
|-bgcolor=PowderBlue
|align=center|2018–19
|align=center|3rd A
|align=center|4
|align=center|27
|align=center|11
|align=center|9
|align=center|7
|align=center|29	 	 	
|align=center|23
|align=center|42
|align=center| finals
|align=center|
|align=center|
|align=center|
|-bgcolor=PowderBlue
| align="center" |2019–20
| align="center" |3rd "A"
| align="center" |9/11
| align="center" |20
| align="center" |5
| align="center" |5
| align="center" |10
| align="center" |22
| align="center" |28
| align="center" |20
| align="center" | finals
| align="center" |
| align="center" |
| align="center" |
|-bgcolor=PowderBlue
| align="center" |2020–21
| align="center" |3rd "A"
| align="center" |6/13
| align="center" |24
| align="center" |10
| align="center" |3
| align="center" |11
| align="center" |38
| align="center" |38
| align="center" |33
| align="center" | finals
| align="center" |
| align="center" |
| align="center" |
|-bgcolor=PowderBlue
| align="center" |2021–22
| align="center" |3rd "A"
| align="center" |8/15
| align="center" |17
| align="center" |7
| align="center" |4
| align="center" |6
| align="center" |29
| align="center" |20
| align="center" |25
| align="center" | finals
| align="center" |
| align="center" |
| align="center" |
|}

Managers

 Vyacheslav Hroznyi – 1990–92 
 Valeriy Petrov – 1992
 Serhiy Morozov – 1995–96
 Oleksandr Ishchenko – 1997–98
 Volodymyr Bezsonov – 2009–11
 Yuriy Solovyenko – 2006
 Ivan Panchyshyn – 2007–08
 Yuriy Solovyenko – 2008
 Bohdan Blavatskyi – 2009
 Oleh Fedorchuk – 2009–11
 Oleh Ostapenko (caretaker) – 2011
 Oleh Shumovytskyi (caretaker) – 2012
 Oleh Ostapenko (caretaker) – 2012
 Volodymyr Reva – 2015–16
 Yuriy Solovyenko – 2016
 Colince Ngaha Poungoue (caretaker) – 2016
 Yuriy Solovyenko (caretaker) – 2016–17
 Volodymyr Horilyi – (11 March 2017 – 18 September 2017) 
 Denys Kolchin – 2017–18
 Colince Ngaha Poungoue – 2019
 Oleh Shumovytskyi – 2019–21
 Volodymyr Tsytkin – 2021
 Ihor Leonov (15 January 2022 – present)

Notes

References

External links
 Official website
 Ukrainian Second League official web site
(In English) Facebook Page
 Fan team website
 Sportive-football club Nyva — V (Спортивно-футбольний клуб "Нива – В"). Dity v misti.

 
Ukrainian Second League clubs
1958 establishments in Ukraine
Association football clubs established in 1958
Sport in Vinnytsia
Football clubs in Vinnytsia Oblast
Football clubs in the Ukrainian Soviet Socialist Republic
Southwestern Railways
Agrarian association football clubs in Ukraine
Railway association football clubs in Ukraine